Huang Chun-hsiung (born January 26, 1933, in Huwei, Yunlin, Taiwan) is a glove puppeteer, narrator, and producer.  He is the second son of the puppeteer Huang Hai-tai. Chun-hsiung learned how to play glove puppets from his father at the age of fourteen.

Journey to become a glove puppeteer 

Huang began his career in glove puppetry behind the scenes.  Gradually, he learned the five major techniques: to “blow” (Suona ; a Chinese musical instrument like Treble horn), to beat (Gong and Drum), to play (Erhu, a Chinese string musical instrument like Violin), to operate (glove puppets), to write (screen), and to narrate.  He is also a Lyricist and Composer.  His works include a number of Theme music such as “A bitter fated Sea Goddess”, “A lady named Leng Shuang Zi”, “Acacia Lamp”, and “The Turning point of Fate”.

When Huang was 19, he established the third organization under “WuChou” Theater, which was later renamed as the “Authentic WuChou Glove Puppet Theatrical Group”.  “The Knight in YunChou - Si Yeng-weng”, premiered on March 2, 1970, was the production during this era.  In the drama, he enlarged the size of glove puppet, emphasized the eye gestures, and used modern folk songs to replace the traditional music composed of gongs and drums.  This drama lasted 583 episodes and created record high television ratings of 97% in 1970.

Family business 

Huang’s sons from previous marriage, and  carried on the family business in late 1990s. Later on, Chiang-hua and Wen-je established their own glove puppet production company named “Pili Recording Company” (renamed as Pili International Multi-media Co.. Ltd in 2000). The main characters remained as Si Yeng-weng and “The man hidden behind Mirror”.

Although his sons and daughters from two marriages have their separate glove puppetry groups, they worked together to support the eighteenth anniversary of Yunlin County Puppet Festival in 2020. The premiere took place at HuWei Highspeed Railway station on October 2, 2020. 

Huang Chun-hsiung's twin sons Wen-yao and Wen-je died on 6 February and 12 June 2022, respectively.

References 

Taiwanese puppeteers
Taiwanese producers
Taiwanese lyricists
Erhu players
Living people
1933 births
People from Yunlin County
Taiwanese dramatists and playwrights
20th-century Taiwanese musicians
20th-century Taiwanese businesspeople
20th-century composers
Taiwanese composers